Realm is a platform video game with shooting elements that was released exclusively for the Super Nintendo Entertainment System in 1996.

Story

Realms takes place in the year 5069, with the player in control of a young Biomech cyborg. An alien invasion has devastated the entire planet of Earth, killing almost every human being and devastating its cities. Earth's last hope is a cyborg that travels through five levels (realms) to defeat the enemies with laser weapons and other Space Age guns and save what is left of humanity.

Reception
This game was released near the end of the Super NES' lifetime. It was reviewed in the September 1996 issue of Nintendo Power - an issue that essentially previewed games that were going to be released in the fourth quarter of that year (up to and including some Christmas releases). A future-themed issue of the same magazine would review this game, giving it average marks in fields like graphics, overall game play, and its overall fun factor. While he criticized the animation and music, Captain Cameron of GamePro gave the game a generally laudatory review, particular noting its hefty challenge, imaginative settings, and colorful, detailed graphics. He summarized, "Unheralded and unexpected, Realm is one of the season's better SNES games ... a well-crafted throwback to Gunstar Heroes-style gameplay that will deliver a much-needed blast of excitement to bored SNES owners."

References

1996 video games
Fiction set in the 6th millennium
Video games about cyborgs
Platform games
Post-apocalyptic video games
Science fiction video games
Side-scrolling video games
Super Nintendo Entertainment System games
Super Nintendo Entertainment System-only games
Titus Software games
Video games developed in France
Flair Software games
Single-player video games